Taha Dyab (born 23 July 1990 in Aleppo, Syria) is a Syrian footballer who plays as a midfielder for Al-Herafyeen, which competes in the Syrian Premier League and is currently a member of the Syria national football team.

Career

Club career 
Dyab started his career in the youth system of Al-Ittihad and he played his first fully professional match in the Syrian Premier League for Al-Ittihad on 30 October 2007 in a 0–0 draw against Al-Futowa. He helped the club reach the final of the AFC Cup the second most important association cup in Asia. Al-Ittihad won the final against Kuwaiti Premier League champions Al-Qadsia after penalties. The game was tied 1–1 after regular time and Extra Time. Dyab signed a two-year contract with Syrian League club Al-Shorta on 3 February 2012. Later on, he had short spells in Iraq, Lebanon and India, before transferring to Al-Herafyeen in 2018.

International career 
Dyab was a part of the Syrian U-19 national team in the 2008 AFC U-19 Championship in Saudi Arabia. 
He has been a regular for the Syrian national football team since 2010 and he debuted in an 18 December 2010 friendly against Iraq. He came on as a substitute for Mohamed Al Zeno in the second halftime and scored on his debut. Dyab was selected to Valeriu Tiţa's 23-man final squad for the 2011 AFC Asian Cup in Qatar, but he not played in any of the three Syrian group games.

International goals 
Scores and results table. Syria's goal tally first:

|}

Honour and Titles

Club 
Al-Ittihad
 Syrian Cup: 2011
 AFC Cup: 2010

References

External links 
 Player profile at Ittihadaleppo.com 

1990 births
Living people
Sportspeople from Aleppo
Syrian footballers
Association football midfielders
Syria international footballers
Syrian expatriate footballers
Expatriate footballers in Iraq
Expatriate footballers in Lebanon
Syrian expatriate sportspeople in Iraq
Expatriate footballers in India
Al-Ittihad Aleppo players
Afrin SC players
Al-Shorta Damascus players
Safa SC players
Salam Zgharta FC players
Al-Majd players
2011 AFC Asian Cup players
AFC Cup winning players
Syrian expatriate sportspeople in Lebanon
Lebanese Premier League players
Syrian Premier League players